Anarthraspis is an extinct genus of placoderm fishes which lived during the Early Devonian period. The type species, Anarthraspis chamberlini, was a contemporary of the placoderm Bryantolepis. The specific epithet, chamberlini, honours British Prime Minister Neville Chamberlain.

References 

Devonian placoderms
Arthrodires
Placoderm families
Early Devonian first appearances
Early Devonian extinctions